Eoporis is a genus of beetles in the family Cerambycidae, containing the following species:

subgenus Eoporimimus
 Eoporis bifasciana Schwarzer, 1925
 Eoporis differens Pic, 1926
 Eoporis mitonoi (Seki, 1946)
 Eoporis pedongensis Breuning, 1969

subgenus Eoporis
 Eoporis elegans Pascoe, 1864

References

Acanthocinini